The Evangelical Philosophical Society (EPS) is an organization devoted to the study of ethics, theology, and religion from an evangelical perspective. Membership is open to professional scholars and associate membership is available to laypersons and students. The current President of the organization is Dr. Michael Austin.

Philosophia Christi

Philosophia Christi is a peer-reviewed academic journal published twice a year by the Evangelical Philosophical Society with the support of Biola University as a vehicle for the scholarly discussion of philosophy and philosophical issues in the fields of apologetics, ethics, theology, and religion.

History 

The Evangelical Philosophical Society is related to the Evangelical Theological Society.  EPS was founded in 1977–78 with 32 charter members.

The first presidents were:

 1977 – Norman Geisler
 1978 – Gordon Lewis
 1979 – Paul Feinberg
 1980 – John Jefferson Davis
 1981 – Gary Habermas
 1982 – Stephen Clinton
 1983 – Win Corduan
 1984 – Terry Miethe
 1985 – William Luck
 1986 – John Feinberg
 1987 – Stephen Spenser
 1988 – Stanley Obbits
 1989 – Russell Bush

See also 
 Society of Christian Philosophers
 Evangelical Theological Society

References

External links
 Evangelical Philosophical Society
 Philosophia Christi
 President Paul Copans' website

Philosophy of religion
Christian philosophy
Evangelical parachurch organizations
Intelligent design movement
Organizations established in 1977
Philosophical societies in the United States
Professional associations based in the United States
American philosophy